The Brihadisvara Temple is a Hindu temple dedicated to Shiva in Gangaikonda Cholapuram, Jayankondam, in the South Indian state of Tamil Nadu. The Gangaikonda Cholapuram Temple is smaller yet more refined than the Thanjavur Temple. Both are among the largest Shiva temples in South India and examples of Dravidian style temples. The temple is also referred to in texts as Gangaikonda Cholapuram Temple or Gangaikondacholeeswaram Temple

The main temple dedicated to Shiva is based on a square plan, but it displays other Hindu deities such as Vishnu, Durga, Surya, Harihara, Ardhanarishvara, and others. It opens to the sunrise and its sanctum, as well as the mandapas, are aligned on an east–west axis. In addition to the main shrine, the temple complex has a number of smaller shrines, gopura, and other monuments, with some partially ruined or restored in later centuries. The temple is famed for its bronze sculptures, artwork on its walls, the depiction of Nandi and the scale of its tower. As well as its notability for having been built by Rajendra I, the temple is also noteworthy for its numerous inscriptions, although none of them are his.

Except for this temple, the old city of Gangaikonda Cholapuram – the capital of a powerful Asian empire from around AD 900 to AD 1215 or over three centuries along with its other major Chola-era Hindu temples have been completely destroyed, leaving a desolate place. The Gangaikonda Cholapuram temple remains an active temple. Four daily rituals, and many yearly festivals are held there, of which the Shivarathri during the Tamil month of Masi (February–March), Aipassi Pournami during Aipassi (October– November) and Thiruvadirai during Margazhi (December–January) are the most prominent. It is one of the most visited tourist attractions in Tamil Nadu. The Archaeological Survey of India (ASI) administers the temple as a protected heritage monument. UNESCO declared it a World Heritage Site in 2004, along with the Brihadeeswarar Temple at Thanjavur and Airavatesvara temple at Darasuram. These are referred to collectively as the Great Living Chola Temples.

Location

All three are UNESCO world heritage sites.

The temple is on Highway 81 connecting Tiruchirappalli and Chidambaram. The nearby city of Chidambaram is connected to other major cities by daily trains on the Indian railway network, Tamil Nadu bus services and  National Highways 36, 81, and 245.

Though inland, the temple is near the Kollidam River, within the Cauveri River delta with access to the Bay of Bengal and through it to the Indian Ocean.

Description

Architecture
Gangaikonda Cholapuram Temple is built in Dravidian architecture with a square plan. The original courtyard is two squares stacked next to each other, all mandapas, the upapitham, the shrine plans, the garbha griha (sanctum) and the tower elements are all square shaped and incorporate circles and principles of geometric symmetry. The structural elements resemble the big Brihadisvara Temple in Thanjavur. Both include a courtyard entered through multiple gateways and relatively small gopuram (tower). Inside are shrines, most of which are aligned on an east–west axis; a few are perpendicular. The temple complex includes Nandi Mandapa, Alankar Mandapa, Maha Mandapa, Mukha Mandapa and Ardha Mandapa. Some of these were added and restored by Hindu kingdoms after the 14th century or by British India art conservation officials in the 19th century.

The square-shaped ardha mandapa connects the sanctum and the great hall. The temple is one of the earliest ones to have pillared halls, which became a common feature in subsequent temples.

Its sanctum measures  and is entered through the Ardha Mandapa. The sanctum contains Brihadeeswarar (Shiva) in the form of lingam.

There is an image of a seated Nandi bull in the courtyard, aligned axially  facing the sanctum. There are five shrines around the sanctum and a Lion well, which was added during the 19th century. The temple site has a monolithic representation of Navagrahas, the nine planetary deities.

Sri-vimana
Historians believe that the height of the temple is deliberately kept low in dimensions compared to the Thanjavur temple as a mark of respect of Rajendra to his father's masterpiece. Compared to the Thanjavur Temple, which has straight contours, this temple has a curvilinear contour, slightly concave towards the top. It is divided into eight zones.

It has two horizontal bands with a massive cornice wrapped around it. Each band has five individual bays on the south, west and east sides with pilasters between the bays. The end bays are squares, the other three are oblong. The center bay of each set of five being the widest. On each side are carvings on the wall with four horizontal rows of friezes. These narrate Hindu legends and Puranic mythologies from the Shaiva, Vaishnava and Shakta traditions. Each storey has moulded horizontal projections (cornices) with floral arch-shaped motifs (gavaksha). According to Balasubrahmanyam, incorporated in the features are mythical creatures in the form of yali, and the entablature is decorated with necklace shaped motifs.

The Sri-vimana at Gangaikonda has nine storeys (talas) including those at the lower levels, in contrast to the thirteen storeys at Thanjavur. Each storey has a square-circle-oblong artwork. The upper levels repeat the lower level design in a rhythmic shrinking pattern. The symmetry principles are dutifully embedded in, but the rate of shrinking is not linear with height. The lower storeys shrink faster than the upper storeys. This gives the vimana an uncommon parabolic form. The griva (neck) is oriented towards the cardinal directions, and like the Thanjavur Temple, Nandi bulls sit on its top corners. Above the griva is the kirtimukhas, then a symmetric open lotus. The tower is capped with a kalasa, whose inscription was once gold coated; the gold is long gone. Above the kalasa is a lotus bud greeting the sky.

Sculpture
There are about fifty sculptural reliefs around the walls of the sanctum, three of which — Nataraja, Saraswati and Shiva garlanding a devotee — being the most prominent. There is a shrine for Shaiva saint and scholar Chandeshvara (one of the sixty-three Nayanars). There are other niches around the temple walls depicting various forms of Shiva, Durga and Vishnu. There are many bronze statues in the temple depicting Chola art of the 11th century, with the one of Kartikeya being the most recognisable.

One relief includes a most unusual portrait of a Hindu ruler who built the temple. Shiva, with Parvati beside him, hands down a garland of flowers to mark his victory to a diminutive seated figure of Rajendra I.

History
The temple was constructed in 1035 AD by Rajendra Chola I (1012-44 CE), the son of the famous Chola king Raja Raja Chola I, who built the Brihadeeswarar Temple at Thanjavur. Some experts believe that the temple was built during 1020, during the 6th regnal year, but inscriptions indicate the 20th regnal year, which is 1035 AD. Rajendra wanted to emulate the temple built by his father after his victory in a campaign across India that Chola era texts state covered Karnataka, Andhra Pradesh, Odisha, and Bengal. After his victory, he demanded that the defeated kingdoms send pots of Ganges River water and pour them into the temple's well. The well was originally called Cholagangam as it was filled with water from Ganges.

Rajendra I, as is Tamil tradition, then assumed the name Gangaikonda Cholan, meaning the one who conquered the Ganges. He established Gangaikonda Cholapuram as his capital from the earlier Chola capital of Thanjavur. Gangaikonda Cholapuram remained the Chola capital for the next 250 years. Rajendra I built the entire capital with several temples using plans and infrastructure recommended in Tamil Vastu and Agama Sastra texts. These included a Dharma Sasta, Vishnu and other temples. However, these structures were destroyed in the late 13th and 14th centuries except this temple. The other Chola landmarks, clearly shown by soil covered mounds and excavated broken pillar stumps and brick walls, are found over a large area nearby. The earliest inscription that mentions this city by name is dated 1029, while the earliest reference to Rajendra I's expedition towards the Ganges river in the north is dated 1023. The first gift to the newly built Gangaikonda Cholapuram temple is dated 1035.

Rajendra I, states Dehejia, must have involved the same craftsmen used by his father and transferred them from Thanjavur. Most or all of the Chola kings from  Rajendra I had their coronation at Gangaikonda Cholapuram. Archaeological excavations have revealed fort walls and palace remains a few kilometers from this temple. It is believed that Kulothunga Chola I, Rajendra's successor, built fortifications around the city.

The reasons for the city's destruction are unclear. According to Vasanthi, the Pandyas who defeated the Cholas during the later part of 13th-century "may have razed the city to ground" to avenge their previous defeats. However, it is unclear why other temples were destroyed and this temple was spared, as well as why there are around twenty inscriptions from later Cholas, Pandyas and Vijayanagar Empires indicating various gifts and grants to this temple if they previously razed this place.

An alternative theory links the destruction to the raids, plunder and wars, particularly with the invasion of the capital city and the territories, that were earlier a part of the Chola and Madurai Empires, by the armies of the Delhi Sultanate led by the Muslim commander Malik Kafur in 1311, followed by Khusrau Khan in 1314, and Muhammad bin Tughlaq in 1327. The period that followed saw wars between the Hindu kings and the Muslim sultans who succeeded the Delhi Sultanate and carved out new states such as the nearby Madurai Sultanate (1335–1378). The Vijayanagara Empire defeated the Madurai Sultanate in 1378 and this temple, along with other Chola era temples, then returned to the control of Hindu kings who repaired and restored many of them.

Texts
Gangaikonda Cholpuram and the temple are mentioned in many of the contemporary works of the period like Muvar Ula and Kalingathuparani. Scholars like Vasanthi believe that the 11th century Tamil poet Kambar's description of Ayodhya was based on the streets and city structure of Gangaikonda Cholapuram. Similar correlation is derived based on the works of Sekkizhar in Periya Puranam. Muvar Ula, a treatise on the Cheras, Cholas and Pandyas, provides a vivid account of the city and the temple. Like the Thanjavur temple, this temple is also believed to have emerged as a centre of social, economic and political activities. Cultural activities like music, dance and art in the form of bronzes were encouraged and staged in the temple.

Today

The temple was added to the list of Great Living Chola Temples in the year 2004. All three temples were built by the Cholas between the 10th and 12th centuries CE and have many similarities. The  Archaeological Survey of India (ASI) made additions to the shopping and visitor attraction offices in the temple in 2009 that included a museum, restaurant, shops and restrooms under the aegis of the Hindu Religious and Endowment Board of the Government of Tamil Nadu. The temples are classified as Great Living Chola Temples as they are still visited, worshiped in and used as they were when they were constructed. The millennium celebration of the coronation of the Rajendra Chola was celebrated in the temple over two days during July 2014.

Festivals and worship practises
Though it is administered by the ASI as a monument, worship practises are followed similar to those at other Shiva temples in Tamil Nadu. The temple follows Saivite tradition and the temple priests perform the pooja (rituals) during festivals and daily basis. The temple rituals are performed four times a day: Kalasanthi at 8:30 a.m., Uchikalam at 12:30 p.m., Sayarakshai at 6:00 p.m., and Arthajamam between 7:30 –8:00 p.m. Each ritual has three steps: alangaram (decoration), neivethanam (food offering) and deepa aradanai (waving of lamps) for both Brihadeeswarar and Periya Nayagi. There are weekly, monthly and fortnightly rituals performed in the temple. The temple is open from 6:00 a.m.–12:30 p.m. and 4:00 p.m.–9:00 p.m. every day. The temple has many festivals in its calendar, with the Shivarathri during the Tamil month of Masi (February–March), Aipassi Pournami during Aipassi (October–November) and Thiruvadirai during Margazhi (December–January) being the most prominent. Annabhishekam, the ablution of the presiding deity with cooked rice is performed during Aipasi festival.

Gallery
The temple features many sculptures and reliefs:

Shaivism

Vaishnavism, Shaktism

Damaged ruins and later additions

See also 
 Raja Raja Chola I
 Chola Dynasty
 Group of Monuments at Mahabalipuram – another world heritage site in Tamil Nadu

Notes

References

Bibliography

External links

 Unesco Great Living Chola Temples

World Heritage Sites in India
Tamil architecture
Hindu temples in Thanjavur
11th-century Hindu temples
Chola architecture
Shiva temples in Ariyalur district